Milgithea alboplagialis is a species of snout moth in the genus Milgithea. It is found in the Huachuca Mountains in Arizona. The wingspan is 23–27 mm.

References

Moths described in 1905
Epipaschiinae